The Guajará River is a river on the island of Marajó in the state of Pará, Brazil.

Course

The Guajará River is one of the main rivers of the  Terra Grande-Pracuúba Extractive Reserve, a sustainable use conservation unit created in 2006.
It flows south into the Pará River, which connects the Amazon River to the Tocantins River.

See also
List of rivers of Pará

References

Rivers of Pará
Tributaries of the Amazon River